Chen Zeyu (born July 24, 1983) is a Chinese actor, model, singer, and a member of the Chinese boyband Go Go Club.

Filmography

Films
2006 Zhen Ai Wu Yan as Lei
2009 Pleasant Goat and Big Big Wolf as Dong Dong

Television
2007  My Prince as Su Ze
2008 The Prince of Tennis as Zhou Zhu
2009 Armor Hero as Ze Xi
2009 The Prince of Tennis 2 as Zhou Zhu

Theatre credits
2010 Killer of the Three Kingdoms as Zhao Yun

References

External links 
  Chen Zeyu's blog

1983 births
Living people
Male actors from Hunan
Chinese male stage actors
Male actors from Changsha
Chinese Mandopop singers
Singers from Hunan
Musicians from Changsha
Chinese male film actors
Chinese male television actors
21st-century Chinese  male singers